The first series of the Ojarumaru anime series aired from October 5, 1998 to February 9, 1999 on NHK for a total of 90 episodes.

The series's opening theme is "Utahito" (詠人) by Saburō Kitajima. The ending theme is "Purin Sanka" (プリン賛歌 The Pudding Anthem) by Sus4.

The series was released on VHS by Nippon Crown across fifteen volumes, each containing 6 episodes, from December 16, 1998 to April 21, 1999. Nippon Crown later released the series on DVD across two compilation volumes, each containing 10 selected episodes, simultaneously on September 21, 2002. The first volume contains episodes 1 through 5, 8, 9, 14, 18, and 24. The second volume contains episodes 32, 38, 39, 43, 68, 71, 77, 79, 80, and 90.

Episodes

References

External links
 Series 1 episode list

Ojarumaru episode lists